Nicolas Cicut (born 28 September 1983) is a French former professional footballer who played as a forward for Olympique de Marseille, Gazelec Ajaccio, AS Cherbourg Football, AS Moulins, and US Marseille Endoume.

External links

1983 births
Living people
Sportspeople from Avignon
French footballers
Footballers from Provence-Alpes-Côte d'Azur
Association football forwards
US Marseille Endoume players
AS Cherbourg Football players
AS Moulins players
Olympique de Marseille players
Gazélec Ajaccio players
Championnat National players